The 1928 United States presidential election in Wyoming took place on November 6, 1928, as part of the 1928 United States presidential election. State voters chose three representatives, or electors, to the Electoral College, who voted for president and vice president.

Wyoming was won by the Republican candidate, Secretary of Commerce and mining engineer Herbert Hoover. from the state of California, running with Senator Charles Curtis, with 63.68 percent of the popular vote, against the Democratic candidate, Governor of New York Al Smith, running with Arkansas Senator and former Governor Joseph Robinson, with 35.37 percent, a 28.3% margin of victory. Hoover won all but one of the state's twenty-three counties, but Smith's victory in Sweetwater County – which had defied the 1924 GOP landslide by voting for Robert La Follette– would with the aid of extensive unionization create a run of Democratic wins in that county extending to 1968.

Just 4 years earlier, Hoover's predecessor, fellow Republican Calvin Coolidge, had carried Wyoming by 20.9% against his nearest rival, Progressive Robert M. La Follette, however in that election the vote was split, with the combined Progressive and Democratic vote total equaling 47.6%, thus giving Coolidge, who received 52.4% of the vote, a victory margin of 4.8%. Hoover's 28.3 point victory marked a swing to the right of 23.5 points, and Wyoming voted 10.9% to the right of the nation in this election. 

Voters associated the booming economy of The Roaring Twenties under Coolidge with Republicans, thus giving Hoover a significant edge in the campaign. In addition to facing an uphill battle to convince voters to abandon the popular Republican policies, Smith, a Roman Catholic, also dealt with significant anti-Catholic prejudice, with many protestants believing he would take orders from The Pope, with some even believing the Pope would move to Washington D.C. if Smith won. Additionally, Smith's opposition to Prohibition, which was the ban on alcoholic beverages, and his association with the corruption of Tammany Hall all but ensured his defeat. His performance was the second worst for a Democrat in Wyoming's history at that time, being surpassed only by James Cox's defeat to Warren Harding in 1920, and would remain the second worst until George McGovern's landslide defeat in 1972. 

Despite his strong performance, over the course of his presidency, the economic boom of the 1920s that had propelled Republicans to success would transform into The Great Depression, which voters associated with Hoover, and he would go on to lose the state by 16 points to Franklin D. Roosevelt in 1932. Hoover's raw vote total was the highest for a Republican in Wyoming's history up until that point, and would remain so until Dwight Eisenhower surpassed it in 1952.

Results

Results by county

See also
 United States presidential elections in Wyoming

References

Wyoming
1928
1928 Wyoming elections